Camilo Gomez may refer to:
Camilo R. Gomez (born 1960), American physician
Camilo Gómez (born 1984), Colombian road cyclist